Aleksander Mekkart (22 October 1893, Tartu – 3 November 1983, New York) was an Estonian politician. He was a member of fourth and fifth legislatures of the Estonian Parliament.

References

1893 births
1983 deaths
Members of the Riigikogu, 1929–1932
Members of the Riigikogu, 1932–1934
Estonian military personnel of the Estonian War of Independence
Estonian emigrants to the United States